Muhammad 'Ali 'Alluba (November 1875/1878 - 25 March 1956) was an Egyptian lawyer, Arab nationalist and diplomat.

References

1870s births
1956 deaths
Egyptian Arab nationalists
Egyptian diplomats
20th-century Egyptian lawyers
Education Ministers of Egypt
Endowments Ministers of Egypt